Iuliia Slobodyan (born ) was a Ukrainian group rhythmic gymnast. She represents her nation at international competitions. 

She participated at the 2008 Summer Olympics in Beijing. She also competed at world championships, including at the 2010  World Rhythmic Gymnastics Championships.

References

External links

https://database.fig-gymnastics.com/public/gymnasts/biography/7505/true?backUrl=%2Fpublic%2Fresults%2Fdisplay%2F544%3FidAgeCategory%3D8%26idCategory%3D78%23anchor_41800
http://www.gymnasticsresults.com/2009/jpn/rgwch/nomentries.pdf 
https://www.youtube.com/watch?v=l_R8SwcWFDk

1992 births
Living people
Ukrainian rhythmic gymnasts
Place of birth missing (living people)
Gymnasts at the 2008 Summer Olympics
Olympic gymnasts of Ukraine
21st-century Ukrainian women